Nebojša Simović (born 15 November 1993) is a Montenegrin handball player for HSG Nordhorn-Lingen and the Montenegro men's national handball team.

He participated at the 2018 European Men's Handball Championship.

References

1993 births
Living people
Montenegrin male handball players
Expatriate handball players
Montenegrin expatriate sportspeople in Hungary